Wyszecki is a surname. Notable people with the surname include:

Wolfgang von Wyszecki (born 1959), German-Canadian actor, screenwriter, and producer
Gunter Wyszecki (1925–1985), German-Canadian physicist

See also
Wysocki